Ozzie Ramos (born September 11, 1996) is an American soccer player who currently plays as a midfielder for USL League One club Central Valley Fuego.

Career

College & Amateur
Ramos began playing for San Diego State University in the fall of 2014, making 19 appearances in his freshman season. Following his sophomore season, Ramos transferred to Seattle University. During his senior season, he was listed as an All-Western Athletic Conference Team Honorable Mention.

While in college, Ramos made appearances with FC Tucson in the Premier Development League.

Atlético Jalisco
Following a successful tryout, Ramos signed for Liga de Balompié Mexicano club Atlético Jalisco in August 2020. He made his competitive debut for the club in October of that year, before the club folded three matches into the 2020–21 season.

Central Valley Fuego
In February 2022, Ramos joined USL League One expansion club Central Valley Fuego FC ahead of their inaugural season. He made his competitive debut for the club in its opening match of the season, tallying 71 minutes in a 2–0 victory over the Greenville Triumph.

Personal life
Born in the United States, Ramos is of Mexican descent.

References

External links

Ozzie Ramos at SofaScore

1996 births
Living people
Soccer players from California
American soccer players
American sportspeople of Mexican descent
San Diego State Aztecs men's soccer players
Seattle Redhawks men's soccer players
FC Tucson players
Central Valley Fuego FC players
USL League Two players
National Independent Soccer Association players
USL League One players
Association football midfielders